Condition code can refer to:

 Condition code register, in computing
 Uncertainty parameter, in astronomy